Mobberley Priory was a priory in Cheshire, England.

References

Monasteries in Cheshire